James Mahmud Rice (born 1972) is an Australian sociologist in the Demography and Ageing Unit, Melbourne School of Population and Global Health, University of Melbourne. He works at the intersection of sociology, economics, and political science, focusing in particular on inequalities in the distribution of economic resources such as income and time and how private and public conventions and institutions shape these inequalities. In 2009 he was awarded the Stein Rokkan Prize for Comparative Social Science Research.

Early life
Rice was born in 1972 in Honolulu, Hawaii. His mother was a Minangkabau woman from Medan, North Sumatra. His father, who was born in Ann Arbor, Michigan, was an economist who taught economics at the University of Hawaii and Monash University, in addition to conducting a large number of consultancies in Indonesia.

Research

Housework and domestic appliances
Whether domestic appliances designed to save time on housework, like dishwashers, microwave ovens, deep freezers, and clothes dryers, actually do save time has been examined in research by Michael Bittman, James Mahmud Rice, and Judy Wajcman. According to this research these appliances rarely reduce the amount of time people spend on housework and can, in some cases, increase this time. These appliances also have little impact on the traditional division of housework between men and women. When appliances do cut time on housework, it is generally men who benefit rather than women. One explanation offered as to why appliances rarely reduce time on housework is that people use appliances to increase housework standards – for example, to cook more or better meals or to produce cleaner clothes – rather than to save time.

Discretionary time and temporal autonomy

Discretionary Time: A New Measure of Freedom by Robert E. Goodin, James Mahmud Rice, Antti Parpo, and Lina Eriksson was published by Cambridge University Press in 2008. It is based on the authors' analysis of data from the United States, Australia, Germany, France, Sweden, and Finland.

The authors propose that temporal autonomy can be used as an indicator of freedom, which is measured by how many hours people are free to do as they please. They then explore how much temporal autonomy people could have under alternative welfare, gender, and household arrangements.

Another one of their statements is that the richer an individual is, the more he or she feels stressed. However, they argue, a richer individual's prosperity could be part of the problem. An example is that a banker who earns £200 per hour has a greater opportunity cost by choosing not to work, than a cleaner who earns only £10 per hour. As a result, the banker may feel compelled to work a greater number of hours than the cleaner does, despite making a greater total income.

Low fertility and standards of living
How low fertility influences standards of living is examined in research published in Science by Ronald Lee, Andrew Mason, James Mahmud Rice, and other members of the National Transfer Accounts Network. This research indicates, on the basis of an analysis of data from 40 countries, that typically fertility well above replacement and population growth would be most beneficial for government budgets. Fertility near replacement and population stability, however, would be most beneficial for standards of living when the analysis includes the effects of age structure on families as well as governments. Fertility moderately below replacement and population decline would maximize standards of living when the cost of providing capital for a growing labour force is taken into account.

Awards and honours
In 2009 Rice was awarded the Stein Rokkan Prize for Comparative Social Science Research, together with Robert E. Goodin, Antti Parpo, and Lina Eriksson. The prize was awarded for their book Discretionary Time: A New Measure of Freedom.

Selected bibliography

Books and reports

Journal articles

References

External links
 James Mahmud Rice's website

1972 births
Australian sociologists
Winners of the Stein Rokkan Prize for Comparative Social Science Research
Minangkabau people
Living people